Teresa Clotilde del Riego, later Teresa Leadbitter (7 April 187623 January 1968) was an English violinist, pianist, singer and composer of Spanish ancestry.

Biography
Teresa Clotilde del Riego was born in London, England. She studied music at the Convent of the Sacred Heart and the West Central College of Music in London with Sir Paolo Tosti and Marie Withrow. Del Riego was heavily involved in World War I charity concerts, and her husband F. Graham Leadbitter died in the war. Her principal residence in later life was at 'Sycamore', Mundesley Road, Overstrand in Norfolk. She is buried in the cemetery there; nearby are the graves of her sister Agnes, the first woman scoutmaster and founder of the Women's Territorial Signalling Corps and her brother, John Anthony del Riego (stage name Philip Desborough). Teresa del Riego died in London at the age of 91.

Works
Del Riego wrote chamber, orchestral, and piano compositions but is best known for ballads and sacred pieces which remained popular through the 20th century. Selected works include:
Homing (1917)
O Dry Those Tears (1901)
Slave Song (1899)
Lead Kindly Light (1909)

Del Riego's works have been recorded and released under the Hyperion, EMI, Romophone, Pearl and RCA labels, including:
A Star Was His Candle Lawrence Tibbett, Baritone(January 1, 1997) Delos
The Golden Age of Brass, Vol.2 Mark Lawrence, American Serenade Band (February 8, 1995) Summit, ASIN: B0000038IT
Dame Eva Turner - The Collected Recordings La Scala Theatre Orchestra (April 25, 2000) Pearl, ASIN: B00004C8TK

References

External links
List of songs
Sheet Music for Homing, Chappell & Co., Ltd., 1917.
Sheet Music for "O Dry Those Tears", Chappell & Co., Ltd., 1901.

1876 births
1968 deaths
20th-century classical composers
Women classical composers
English classical composers
20th-century English composers
20th-century English women musicians
20th-century women composers